Enoch Township is one of the fifteen townships of Noble County, Ohio, United States.  The 2000 census found 413 people in the township, 409 of whom lived in the unincorporated portions of the township.

Geography
Located in the south central part of the county, it borders the following townships:
Center Township - north
Stock Township - northeast
Jefferson Township - southeast
Jackson Township - southwest corner
Olive Township - west

A tiny portion of the small village of Dexter City is located in far southwestern Enoch Township.

Name and history
Enoch Township has the name of Elisha Enochs, an early settler and local officeholder. It is the only Enoch Township statewide.

Government
The township is governed by a three-member board of trustees, who are elected in November of odd-numbered years to a four-year term beginning on the following January 1. Two are elected in the year after the presidential election and one is elected in the year before it. There is also an elected township fiscal officer, who serves a four-year term beginning on April 1 of the year after the election, which is held in November of the year before the presidential election. Vacancies in the fiscal officership or on the board of trustees are filled by the remaining trustees.

References

External links
Noble County Chamber of Commerce 

Townships in Noble County, Ohio
Townships in Ohio